Stephen Gittins (29 August 1959 – 20 February 2013) was an English professional darts player.

Career 
Gittins played twice at the BDO World Darts Championship. In 1989, he beat Finland's Kexi Heinäharju in the first round but lost in the second round to five-time World Champion Eric Bristow. He returned to the Lakeside a year later and again reached the second round, beating Australian Wayne Weening in round one, but again lost in the second round to Bristow.

Gittins also played twice at the Winmau World Masters, reaching the quarter-finals in 1985. Gittins also won three open tournaments, winning the Welsh Open and Swedish Open in 1988 and then the Finnish Open in 1989.

Gittins disappeared from the scene after the 1990 BDO World Darts Championship but briefly made a comeback at the 2005 PDC UK Open. Winning through the preliminaries he lost in the first round.

Gittins died on 20 February 2013.

World Championship results

BDO 
 1989: Last 16: (Lost to Eric Bristow 0–3)
 1990: Last 16: (Lost to Bristow 2–3)

External links 
Steve Gittins's profile and stats on Darts Database

English darts players
2013 deaths
1959 births
Sportspeople from Shropshire
British Darts Organisation players